Calvin Lawrence Christensen (July 8, 1927 – August 31, 2011) was an American basketball player.

He played collegiately for the University of Toledo.

He was selected by the Tri-Cities Blackhawks in the 5th round of the 1950 NBA draft.

He played for the Blackhawks (1950–51), Milwaukee Hawks (1951–52) and Rochester Royals (1952–55) in the NBA for 291 games. He died in 2011 in Waterville, Ohio where he lived with his wife of 51 years, Sharon.

References

External links

1927 births
2011 deaths
American men's basketball players
Basketball players from Ohio
Centers (basketball)
Milwaukee Hawks players
People from Waterville, Ohio
Power forwards (basketball)
Rochester Royals players
Sportspeople from Toledo, Ohio
Toledo Rockets men's basketball players
Tri-Cities Blackhawks draft picks
Tri-Cities Blackhawks players
Washington Generals players